Jan Hejda (born June 18, 1978) is a Czech former professional ice hockey defenceman who played with the Edmonton Oilers, the Columbus Blue Jackets and the Colorado Avalanche in the National Hockey League (NHL).

Playing career
Hejda was originally selected in the 4th round, 106th overall in the 2003 NHL Entry Draft by the Buffalo Sabres. He played six seasons with HC Slavia Praha of the Czech Extraliga, two seasons with HC CSKA Moscow of the Russian Super League, and one season with Khimik Moscow Oblast, also of the Russian Super League.

In July 2006, Hejda was traded to the Edmonton Oilers by the Sabres in exchange for a seventh-round draft pick. He was then signed to his first NHL contract by the Oilers, to a one-year deal the same week.

Hejda scored his first NHL goal on January 8, 2007, against the Los Angeles Kings netminder Mathieu Garon.  The Kings' Konstantin Pushkarev had scored his first NHL goal in the game's third period to send the game into overtime; Hejda's goal in overtime gave the Oilers their 2–1 win.

In July 2007, Hejda signed a 1-year, $1 million deal with the Columbus Blue Jackets. He turned out to be one of the club's best defensemen the following season, ending with a team-record +20 plus-minus on a team that had never had anyone finish higher than +13 before. He subsequently signed a 3-year deal worth $6 million on April 29, 2008. After not scoring the previous season, Hejda scored three goals in addition to 18 assists during the 2008–09 season. He also played in three of the Blue Jackets' four playoff games in their opening-round series against the Detroit Red Wings, Columbus' first-ever playoff appearance.

Hejda was hit in the head by Raffi Torres from an elbow. For this act Torres was fined $2,500.

On the first day of free agency prior to the 2011–12 season, Hejda's emergence as a stay-at-home defenseman was rewarded when he was promptly signed to a four-year, $15 million contract with the Colorado Avalanche on July 1, 2011. Hejda made his Avalanche debut on opening night in a 3–0 defeat to the Detroit Red Wings on October 8, 2011. He instantly established himself within the Avalanche blueline, playing in 81 games and leading all Avalanche players in ice time throughout the season. He tied first amongst the defenseman with 5 goals and featured in his 400th career NHL game against the Winnipeg Jets on February 19, 2012.

In the lockout-shortened 2012–13 season, Hejda appeared in 46 games and finished second on the blueline in scoring with only 10 points. On February 26, 2013, Hejda matched a career high in posting 2 assists in a shootout defeat to the San Jose Sharks to reach the 100-career point mark in the NHL. In the 2013–14 season, Hejda helped the Avalanche rebound to reach the post-season, playing alongside defensive partner Erik Johnson, to form the team's top defensive pairing. He scored a career high 6 goals in 78 games and made his 500th regular season appearance against the San Jose Sharks on December 23, 2013. In the last regular season game, Hejda suffered two broken fingers against the Anaheim Ducks on April 13, 2014. Although visibly impeding his game, Hejda appeared in all 7 post-season contests, leading the club with 18 blocked shots, against the Minnesota Wild.

At the completion of his four-year contract with the Avalanche following the 2014–15 season, Hejda became a free agent over the summer. Unable to earn a contract offer from an NHL team, Hejda accepted a try-out invitation to attend the Chicago Blackhawks training camp on September 12, 2015. Despite a solid camp with the Blackhawks, Hejda was not tendered a contract due to a crowded blueline and was released on September 27, 2015. Two months into the 2015–16 season, looking for an opportunity to play, Hejda returned to the Columbus Blue Jackets fold in signing a professional try-out contract with AHL affiliate, the Lake Erie Monsters on December 7, 2015. Hejda played in the American league for the first time since 2006, appearing in 11 scoreless games with the Monsters before he was released from his try-out on January 8, 2016.

Personal life
Hejda resides in Denver, Colorado and is married to his wife Tereza with whom he has two children, a daughter, Natalia, and son, Matheas. He coached his son's youth team at the   9280 Pond Hockey Tournament in Keystone. He has the role of Director of Player Development of Europe/Western U.S. for Edge Sports Management.

Career statistics

Regular season and playoffs

International

References

External links
 

1978 births
Living people
Buffalo Sabres draft picks
Colorado Avalanche players
Columbus Blue Jackets players
Czech ice hockey defencemen
Edmonton Oilers players
Czech expatriate ice hockey players in Russia
Hamilton Bulldogs (AHL) players
Atlant Moscow Oblast players
HC CSKA Moscow players
HC Slavia Praha players
Ice hockey players at the 2010 Winter Olympics
Lake Erie Monsters players
Olympic ice hockey players of the Czech Republic
Ice hockey people from Prague
HC Bílí Tygři Liberec players
Czech expatriate ice hockey players in the United States
Czech expatriate ice hockey players in Canada